Greensburg is a city in and the county seat of Decatur County, Indiana. The population was 12,312 at the time of the 2020 census.

History 
Greensburg was laid out in 1822. The founder, Thomas Hendricks Sr.'s wife being a native of Greensburg, Pennsylvania, caused the name to be selected.

The first post office at Greensburg opened in 1823, but the name of the post office was spelled Greensburgh until 1894.

At the beginning of the twentieth century, race relations in Greensburg worsened, leading to the expulsion of African Americans from the city after race riots against them in 1906 and 1907. According to James W. Loewen, Greensburg then was for decades a sundown town, a town that was purposely all-white.

In 2021, Greensburg offered incentives for remote workers to move to the city. Eligibility requirements included having a remote position based outside Greensburg or self-employment, be at least 18 years old, and eligible to work in the U.S. The incentive package included $5,000 to offset moving expenses, a year's membership to the local co-working space and YMCA, gift cards to the seasonal farmers market, tickets throughout the year to productions at the local playhouse, home-cooked meals and a program called "Grandparents on Demand", which offered babysitting hours and a stand in on Grandparents Day at school.

Geography

Climate
Greensburg is characterized by relatively high temperatures and evenly distributed precipitation throughout the year. Temperatures are high and can lead to warm, oppressive nights. Summers are usually somewhat wetter than winters, with much of the rainfall coming from convectional thunderstorm activity. The Köppen Climate Classification subtype for this climate is "Cfa" (Humid Subtropical Climate).

Demographics

2010 census
As of the census of 2010, there were 11,492 people, 4,661 households, and 2,927 families living in the city. The racial makeup of the city was 96.1% White, 0.4% African American, 0.2% Native American, 1.3% Asian, 0.9% from other races, and 0.9% from two or more races. Hispanic or Latino of any race were 2.4% of the population.

There were 4,661 households, of which 32.5% had children under the age of 18 living with them, 44.2% were married couples living together, 13.8% had a female householder with no husband present, 4.8% had a male householder with no wife present, and 37.2% were non-families. 31.5% of all households were made up of individuals, and 13.2% had someone living alone who was 65 years of age or older. The average household size was 2.38 and the average family size was 2.98.

The median age in the city was 37 years. 25% of residents were under the age of 18; 8.6% were between the ages of 18 and 24; 26.4% were from 25 to 44; 24.5% were from 45 to 64; and 15.6% were 65 years of age or older. The gender makeup of the city was 47.9% male and 52.1% female.

2000 census
As of the census of 2000, there were 10,260 people, 4,178 households, and 2,778 families living in the city. The racial makeup of the city was 97.57% White, 0.08% African American, 0.16% Native American, 1.39% Asian, 0.01% Pacific Islander, 0.10% from other races, and 0.69% from two or more races. Hispanic or Latino of any race were 0.62% of the population.

There were 4,178 households, out of which 31.6% had children under the age of 18 living with them, 50.7% were married couples living together, 12.1% had a female householder with no husband present, and 33.5% were non-families. 28.9% of all households were made up of individuals, and 12.3% had someone living alone who was 65 years of age or older. The average household size was 2.39, and the average family size was 2.92.

In the city, the population was spread out, with 24.6% under the age of 18, 10.0% from 18 to 24, 28.9% from 25 to 44, 20.8% from 45 to 64, and 15.6% who were 65 years of age or older. The median age was 36 years. For every 100 females, there were 91.2 males. For every 100 females age 18 and over, there were 86.9 males.

The median income for a household in the city was $38,029, and the median income for a family was $45,439. Males had a median income of $31,662 versus $24,605 for females. The per capita income for the city was $18,829. About 8.0% of families and 11.4% of the population were below the poverty line, including 15.2% of those under age 18 and 12.1% of those age 65 or over.

Economy 
The largest employer in Greensburg is Delta Faucet Company, who has operated a manufacturing facility in the city since 1958. In addition to faucet components, Delta's Greensburg plant also produces bath tubs and shower fixtures.

Honda Motor Company operates an automobile manufacturing plant (Honda Manufacturing of Indiana, LLC) along Interstate 74 in Greensburg. The company purchased  at the northwest edge of Greensburg in 2006. It took about 16 months to develop the site and construct the massive auto assembly facility. Mass production of the Honda Civic (eighth generation) sedan commenced at this plant on October 9, 2008. A second shift was added in fall 2011. Production capacity was increased by 25% to accommodate the start of production of the Civic hybrid in early 2013. In 2018, Honda invested US$32.5 million to expand its plant with a new 19,200 square-foot building for new in-house subassembly of vehicles’ front end module, including radiator and cooling fan.

As of September 2021, Honda Manufacturing of Indiana employs over 2,700 people and produces the eleventh-generation Honda Civic hatchback, the fifth-generation Honda CR-V, and the third-generation Honda Insight. The Acura ILX was also assembled at Honda Manufacturing of Indiana from 2012 to 2015 until production was transferred to Honda's plant in Marysville, Ohio. The Acura ILX hybrid became the first hybrid model built by Honda in North America. Honda has been exporting Civic made in Indiana to Mexico, Latin America, the Caribbean, and the U.S. territories of Puerto Rico, Guam and Saipan since 2009.

Landmarks
The Bromwell Wire Works, Decatur County Courthouse, Greensburg Carnegie Public Library, Greensburg Downtown Historic District, Bright B. Harris House, Jerman School, and Knights of Pythias Building and Theatre are listed on the National Register of Historic Places.

Tree on the Courthouse Tower

The Decatur County Courthouse in Greensburg is known for a tree which grows from the top of the Courthouse Tower, giving Greensburg its nickname, "Tree City".

There have been one or more trees growing continually since the first tree was noticed in the early 1870s. Later, other small trees appeared on the clock tower.

County officials were initially concerned that the trees would cause damage to the roof, and a steeplejack was hired in the 1880s to remove some of them. By the time it died, another tree had appeared.

Today, there are two trees on the tower. During a recent tree trimming a piece of the tree was examined by several Purdue University foresters and they positively identified the tree as a mulberry tree.

Healthcare 
Decatur County Memorial Hospital has served the community since 1922. The facility offers a full range of both inpatient and outpatient services including 24/7 Emergency services. Hyperbaric Oxygen Chambers are available in the Center for Wound Healing at DCMH and the Hospital was one of the first in the state to acquire a 128-slice CT scanner. The Hospital Foundation of Decatur County has served to provide financial support for the facility and its programs. Major capital campaigns in 1995 and 2003 helped fund significant growth in the facility. A vertical expansion will add two floors to the 2003 addition including a new medical/surgical unit with all private rooms.

In addition to the main campus the Hospital owns the Medical Arts Plaza at 955 N. Michigan Ave., Greensburg. The  facility houses the Occupational Health program - "Workwell" and contains a lab, x-ray and the Tree City Medical Partners Physician's Practice as well as space for other physicians.

Transportation 
Greensburg is located adjacent to Interstate 74 halfway between Indianapolis and Cincinnati. U.S. Route 421 links Greensburg with Indianapolis to the north and Lexington, Kentucky, to the south. State Road 3 connects Greensburg with Muncie and Fort Wayne to the north and the Indiana suburbs of Louisville, Kentucky, to the south. State Road 46 links the community with Columbus, Bloomington, and Terre Haute to the west and Batesville to the east. Recently a construction project, which has made going east on Interstate 74 from the ramp west of town possible, has been completed.

Greensburg is a likely train stop on the proposed high-speed rail line between Indianapolis and Cincinnati. This line is part of the Midwest Regional Rail Initiative, which is the master plan for a high-speed rail network throughout the midwestern United States.

There are tentative plans to either expand the current runway or build a new airport elsewhere in Decatur County.

Media 
Greensburg has one newspaper, the Greensburg Daily News, which is published Mondays through Saturdays. The paper is owned by CNHI.

Greensburg is also home to 1330 AM 104.3 FM WTRE, a locally owned and operated 500-watt AM/FM radio station that plays country music, local news, and local sports from area high schools.

Notable people
 Annie Laurie Adams Baird (1864–1916), American missionary in Korea
 William Cumback (1829–1905), attorney, Civil War Army paymaster, U.S. representative, and 16th lieutenant governor of Indiana
 Carl G. Fisher (1874–1939), entrepreneur involved with starting Indianapolis Motor Speedway and developing Miami Beach
 James Bradford Foley (1807–1886), politician elected to Thirty-fifth Congress
 John Goodnow (1858–1907), United States consul general in Shanghai from 1897 to 1905
 Marc Griffin (born in 1956), lawyer, world's youngest judge
 Thomas Hendricks Sr. (1773–1835), veteran of War of 1812, founded Greensburg in 1821, which was named by his wife in 1822; served in Indiana House of Representatives and Indiana State Senate
 Ezekiel J. Ingersoll (1838–1925), Illinois state representative and businessman
 Oliver Kessing (1890–1963), the third and last commissioner of the All-America Football Conference
 Rose McConnell Long (1892–1970), United States senator and the wife of Huey Long; third woman to ever serve in the U.S. Senate
 Bryant McIntosh (born November 20, 1994), college basketball player for Northwestern Wildcats men's basketball team
 Alex Meyer (born in 1990), former Major League Baseball player for Los Angeles Angels
 Dave Robbins, jazz trombonist, composer, and educator
 Wilbur Shaw (1902–1954), three-time Indianapolis 500 winner and president of Indianapolis Motor Speedway
 Roy Henry Thorpe (1874–1951), politician elected to 67th United States Congress in 1922
 Gilbert Van Camp (1814–1900), businessman who founded Van Camp canning company
 John T. Wilder (1830–1917), industrialist and Civil War Union General, known for commanding Lightning Brigade and for success at Battle of Chickamauga
 Aldred Scott Warthin (1866–1931), pathologist known as the "father of cancer genetics"

References

External links

 City of Greensburg, Indiana official website
 Greensburg Chamber of Commerce
 Arts & Cultural Council of Decatur County

Cities in Indiana
Cities in Decatur County, Indiana
Micropolitan areas of Indiana
County seats in Indiana
1822 establishments in Indiana
Sundown towns in Indiana